Beckenham Hospital was a healthcare facility based in Beckenham, Kent.

History
The hospital was founded by Peter Richard Hoare, the younger (1803-1877) of Kelsey Manor as the Beckenham Cottage Hospital in 1872. Additional facilities were added in 1877 (the Lea Wilson Ward), in 1899 (the Diamond Jubilee Extension) and in 1924 (the Percy Jones Ward). It became the Beckenham General Hospital in 1929 and benefited from further facilities in 1932 (the Ruth Sutton Ward) and in 1939 (the Trapnell Wing).

After it joined the National Health Service in 1948, a new out-patients department was completed in 1959 and the Douglas Lindsay Ward was added in 1969. The hospital closed in 2005 and the site has been developed as a primary healthcare centre known as Beckenham Beacon which opened in 2009.

See also
 List of hospitals in England

References

Defunct hospitals in London